Dorridge railway station serves the village of Dorridge in the West Midlands of England. The station is served by Chiltern Railways, who manage the station, and also by West Midlands Trains.

History
The station was built by the Great Western Railway in 1852, on their line from Birmingham to Oxford.  In the past, the station was known as Knowle and Dorridge, as it also serves the nearby village of Knowle. Prior to electrification of the former LMS line from London Euston to Birmingham New Street the former GWR London Paddington - Birkenhead Woodside trains passed through the station but did not stop.

The station was renamed from Knowle to Dorridge on 6 May 1974.

Facilities
There is a self-service ticket machine installed outside the main building on platform 1 for use outside times that the station is staffed. Other amenities available include a coffee shop, toilets and bicycle rack on platform 1 and a waiting room on platforms 2 and 3. Train running information is provided via automated announcements, timetable posters and CIS screens.  All three platforms have step-free access (platforms 2 & 3 via lifts built into the footbridge).

Services and Platforms

Services
Dorridge station is served by trains operated by Chiltern Railways and West Midlands Railway. The current off peak service in trains per hour is:

Chiltern Railways
 1 tp2h to 
 1 tph to London Marylebone 
 1 tp2h to  via Solihull
 1 tph to  via Solihull

West Midlands Railway
 1 tph to  via Moor Street and via Solihull
 1 tph to  via Moor Street and Solihull
 1 tph to  via Moor Street and Solihull

Platforms
The station has 3 platforms. Platform 1 serves southbound Chiltern Railways and West Midlands Railway services to Leamington Spa, London Marylebone and Stratford-upon-Avon. Platform 2 serves northbound trains towards Birmingham, Stourbridge Junction and Kidderminster from the south and platform 3 is used by local West Midlands Railway services that originate/terminate here on the line towards Birmingham, Stourbridge and Worcester.

1963 crash

On 15 August 1963 three train crew died in the Knowle and Dorridge rail crash.

References

External links

Knowle & Dorridge station at warwickshirerailways.com
Rail Around Birmingham and the West Midlands: Dorridge station

Railway stations in Solihull
DfT Category E stations
Former Great Western Railway stations
Railway stations in Great Britain opened in 1852
Railway stations served by Chiltern Railways
Railway stations served by West Midlands Trains
1852 establishments in England